The Shoppes at South Hills, formerly South Hills Mall, is a shopping mall on U.S. 9, now converted into a strip mall, in the town of Poughkeepsie, New York. The 675,000 ft² plaza opened in 1974 and included two anchors, Sears and Kmart, at opposite ends of the mall. Currently, The Shoppes at South Hills are owned and operated by DLC Management Corporation.

The mall is adjacent to its more successful rival, the Poughkeepsie Galleria, and the two properties are linked by a series of roads between the two properties. These roads pass directly in front of a Lowe's. situated on a plot between the Shoppes and the Galleria. The Galleria's existence led to the slow decline and eventual closing of South Hills Mall. The mall was demolished, rebuilt, rebranded, and reopened in 2008 following the closing of the indoor mall. Old "South Hills Mall" signage remained up for several months after reconstruction completed.

History

History of South Hills 
South Hills Mall was the first indoor shopping mall in Poughkeepsie and the second in Dutchess County (after Dutchess Mall in Fishkill, 10 miles south). It was constructed at a cost of $110 million. Upon opening, anchors were Sears and Kmart, in addition to dozens of smaller shops and stores, including Record World, Walden Books, NY Piano and Organ, Spencer Gifts, and Endicott Johnson Shoes. The original plan called for Forbes & Wallace as the other anchor. South Hills quickly became the dominant retail center in the Poughkeepsie area, leading to the closing of prominent downtown retailer Luckey Platt & Co. in 1981.  An eight-screen movie theater opened in 1984 in the space previously occupied by Park Place Roller Rink.

In 1985, an expansion in the center of the mall added a food court, which featured a Burger King, a sandwich shop, and a pizza place, as well as a Hess's department store.

In the early 1980s, an initial proposal for a two-story mall adjacent to South Hills was submitted; after several years of protests, this proposal became the Poughkeepsie Galleria and opened in 1987. Though the malls co-existed successfully for the first several years of the Galleria's existence, as the 1990s began South Hills began to suffer. The decline largely began in 1991 when Hess's closed their location and Sears moved to the Galleria; the Hess's space was replaced by Burlington Coat Factory while the Sears space was divided between Pharmhouse and a (freestanding) Price Chopper supermarket. Service Merchandise relocated to this mall in 1995 after closing their location at the Dutchess Mall. It is believed that both stores were open at the same time for a while, with the Dutchess Mall location closing before the company went out of business in 2002.

In the 1990s, South Hills was sold to Sarakreek Holdings NV, a Dutch property holding firm which attempted to revive the mall by opening "big-box" retailers like Media Play, Old Navy, Office Max, Discovery Zone, and Bob's Stores. The success was short-lived; in the long run the alienation of smaller stores by the larger ones only led to a further, greater decline resulting in the closure of all the aforementioned retailers.

By the late 1990s, Sarakreek sold South Hills to the Dagar Group, a locally based retail ownership group. The mall's decline accelerated after this change as many smaller tenants left the mall. Filling those holes have been smaller, independent shops which existed for only a brief time. The Service Merchandise location has been largely vacant, minus several months as an overstock book store. After Phar-Mor, parent of Pharmhouse, folded, the space has played host to two different furniture stores. The closings of Media Play, OfficeMax, and Price Chopper supermarket in 2006 did not bode well for the mall. The Price Chopper location was subsequently replaced by a ShopRite supermarket and has remained successful.

All other smaller stores in the mall had closed by December 31, 2007. Despite all other stores being closed, the interior halls of the South Hills Mall remained open.

For a period of time from January through May 2008, the only remaining sources of income for the mall were the major anchor stores; Silver Cinemas, Kmart, Burlington Coat Factory, ShopRite, and Namco Pools (not to be confused with the Japanese video game company).

In July 2008, construction crews began to demolition of the site, while four of the five remaining tenants remained open. Kmart remained at the south end of the mall, Burlington in the middle and ShopRite at the north end. Kmart retained a section of the South Hills Mall interior walkway, as a way to allow customers who parked behind the property to reach the store. The Namco Pools relocated down the road to a new space in Wappingers Falls, New York.

The space, newly rebranded as the Shoppes and South Hills strip mall, finished construction in 2009, with Christmas Tree Shops and New England-based Bob's Discount Furniture both opening their doors the same year. Pet Goods and Oklahoma-based arts and crafts store Hobby Lobby opened in 2012.

On February 25, 2014, Silver Cinemas screened its last films and closed. It has since reopened under new management, rebranded as Empire Cinemas. In February 2019, Empire Cinemas also closed. 2014 also saw the opening of furniture and home goods retailer Ashley Furniture.

Fitness chain Orangetheory Fitness and frozen yogurt retailer Peachwave both opened locations on the property in 2015.

On April 14, 2016, Sears Holdings, the parents company of both Kmart and Sears, announced it was closing 10 Sears stores and 68 Kmart stores. The Shoppes at South Hills was among those closing. Following a months-long liquidation sale of all merchandise and assets the store had, the Kmart officially closed on July 31, 2016.

History of management 
 Unknown (January 1974 - February 1990)
 Sarakreek Holdings NV (March 1990 - late 1990s)
 Dagar Group (late 1990s - October 2005)
 Vornado Realty Trust (November 2005 - December 2014)
 DLC Management Corporation (January 2015 – present)

References

External links
DeadMalls.com Profile
Photos of South Hills Mall
KMart & Burlington Coat Factory To Stay - Poughkeepsie Journal
The Shoppes at South Hills (Site Plan)
Requiem for a mall

Shopping malls established in 1974
Shopping malls in New York (state)
Buildings and structures in Poughkeepsie, New York
U.S. Route 9
Shopping malls in the New York metropolitan area